Arianus's rat (Rattus omichlodes), also known as Arianus' New Guinea mountain rat, is a species of rat native to the mountains of Papua Province, Indonesia.

References

Rattus
Mammals described in 1979